The 2023 UConn Huskies softball team represents the University of Connecticut in the 2023 NCAA Division I softball season. The Huskies are led by Laura Valentino in her 4th year as head coach, and play as part of the Big East Conference after joining the conference for the 2020–21 academic year.  They play their home games at Connecticut Softball Stadium.

Previous season
UConn finished with a final record of 38–18, and finished first in the Big East with a conference record of 20–4.  They reached the final of the Big East tournament, but fell to Villanova for the second year in a row.

Personnel

Roster

Coaches

Schedule

References 

UConn
UConn Huskies softball seasons
UConn softball